Tirkey is a surname. Notable people with the surname include:

Bandhu Tirkey, Indian politician and a former Member of Jharkhand Legislative Assembly
Bhushan Tirkey, Indian politician and member of Jharkhand Mukti Morcha
Clement Tirkey, bishop of the Roman Catholic Diocese of Jalpaiguri, India
Dasrath Tirkey, politician, member of the All India Trinamool Congress
Dilip Tirkey (born 1977), former Indian field hockey player
Dipsan Tirkey (born 1998), Indian field hockey player
Ignace Tirkey, Indian field Hockey player
Manohar Tirkey (born 1953), member of the 15th Lok Sabha
Pius Tirkey (1928–2014), Indian politician
Prabodh Tirkey (born 1984), Indian hockey midfielder
Roselina Tirkey (born 1982), Indian politician
Rupa Rani Tirkey (born 1987), international Indian lawn bowler
Sarita Tirkey, Indian international lawn bowler
Sunil Chandra Tirkey, Indian Minister of State for Consumer Affairs in West Bengal
Surya Tirkey (born 1998), Indian professional footballer